A concept car (also known as a concept vehicle, show vehicle or prototype) is a car made to showcase new styling and/or new technology. They are often exhibited at motor shows to gauge customer reaction to new and radical designs which may or may not be mass-produced. General Motors designer Harley Earl is generally credited with inventing the concept car, and did much to popularize it through its traveling Motorama shows of the 1950s.

Concept cars never go into production directly. In modern times all would have to undergo many changes before the design is finalized for the sake of practicality, safety, regulatory compliance, and cost. A "production-intent" prototype, as opposed to a concept vehicle, serves this purpose.

Design 
Concept cars are often radical in engine or design. Some use non-traditional, exotic, or expensive materials, ranging from paper to carbon fiber to refined alloys. Others have unique layouts, such as gullwing doors, 3 or 5 (or more) wheels, or special abilities not usually found on cars. Because of these often impractical or unprofitable leanings, many concept cars never get past scale models or even drawings in computer design. Other more traditional concepts can be developed into fully drivable (operational) vehicles with a working drivetrain and accessories. The state of most concept cars lies somewhere in between and does not represent the final product. A very small proportion of concept cars are functional to any useful extent, some cannot move safely at speeds above .

Inoperative "mock-ups" are usually made of wax, clay, metal, fiberglass, plastic or a combination thereof.

If drivable, the drivetrain is often borrowed from a production vehicle from the same company or may have defects and imperfections in design. They can also be quite refined, such as General Motors' Cadillac Sixteen concept.

After a concept car's useful life is over, the cars are usually destroyed. Some survive, however, either in a company's museum or hidden away in storage. One unused but operational concept car that languished for years in the North Hollywood, California, shop of car customizer George Barris, Ford Motor Company's "Lincoln Futura" from 1954, received a new lease on life as the Batmobile in the Batman series that debuted in 1966 on the ABC Television Network.

Notable concept cars

See also 

 Auto show
 Car design
 Concept art
 Pre-production car
 Production vehicle
 Product lifecycle management
 Proof-of-concept
 Prototype
 Serial production
 Show car

References

External links 

 
 Old Concept Cars
 Concept Cars & Car Design Information
 Information on over 250 concept cars
 Comparison of concept car and production version
 Concept Cars Index
 Car Concepts
 Concept Car
 Concept Cars at www.allcarindex.com - The index of concept cars is dedicated to the showcars and concept automobiles